Donald E. Massey (April 28, 1928 – June 9, 2011), known as the “Cadillac King”, was an American car dealer who owned a chain of automobile dealerships in the United States.

Career

Dealerships
Don Massey’s career started in construction in his home state of Tennessee.  In 1955, he moved his family to the Detroit area and began selling cars.  Massey was a natural salesman and by the late 1950s had been promoted to used car manager and then general manager at a Chevrolet dealership in Detroit.  In 1961, Massey opened his own used car lot in Wayne, Michigan.  About six years later, Massey bought part of the Beglinger Oldsmobile-Cadillac agency in Plymouth, Michigan and it became Beglinger-Massey Oldsmobile-Cadillac.  In 1974, Massey took over full operation of the business and the dealership was renamed Don Massey Cadillac.  In 1978, the dealership was relocated to a brand new 54,000 square foot facility about a mile and a half east of the previous site.  The new location would be the company's flagship store and by the early 1990s had become the most volume selling Cadillac dealership in the United States.

In the years and decades that followed, Massey would continue to acquire dealerships in Michigan and several other states.  These included dealerships purchased in partnership with professional golfer Arnold Palmer.  At his peak, Massey was the largest Cadillac retailer in the country, accounting for approximately 6% of the brand's sales.  In addition to Cadillac, other brands sold at various Don Massey dealerships included Bentley, Buick, Chevrolet, Geo, GMC, Honda, Oldsmobile, Pontiac, Rolls-Royce, Saab, Saturn,  and Sterling.

Massey retired in 2002 and sold his 16-store dealership empire to Sonic Automotive.

Bid for DeLorean Motor Company
In November 1982, Charles DeLorean, a Cadillac dealer in Lakewood, Ohio and brother of John DeLorean, teamed up with Don Massey to try to acquire the assets of bankrupt DeLorean Motor Company.  Their attempt was unsuccessful as a federal bankruptcy judge instead approved the sale to Columbus, Ohio-based Consolidated International.

Last Cadillac Eldorado
On April 22, 2002, the last Cadillac Eldorado rolled off the assembly line at the Lansing Craft Center assembly plant in Lansing, Michigan.  The car was donated to the Cadillac Museum in honor of Don Massey.

Philanthropy
Massey created the Joyce and Don Massey Family Foundation in honor of his wife, Joyce, who was severely injured in an automobile accident in 1983.  The foundation supports research, education and care for patients with traumatic brain injuries.

Personal life
Massey was married to Joyce (née Coleman) from 1945 until her death in 1993.  They had three children.  Massey died on June 9, 2011 at his home in Northville, Michigan at the age of 83. 

According to Mlive, the home in 2019 went on the market for $3.5M.

References

1928 births
2011 deaths
American automobile salespeople